Kazakh diaspora is a term used to collectively to describe the ethnic or people of Kazakh descent who reside in outside of Kazakhstan across the world in various countries as a result of annexed territories and diasporic migration in the late 19th and early 20th centuries. It is estimated that more than four million Kazakhs live abroad. Although the Kazakh diaspora is usually a sparse one, particularly in Western Europe and United States, it retains ethnic enclaves within the countries of Turkey, Iran, and Afghanistan.

The Kazakh diaspora originates from forced migrations which originally began since the foundation of the Kazakh Khanate and its national identity of Kazakhs beginning in the 15th century. During that time, a series of Kazakh exodus took place in result of conflicts and wars that took place in the territory of Kazakhstan to neighbouring territories. However, it wasn't until in the beginning of the 20th century where a modern Kazakh diaspora began forming as by that time, Kazakhstan was under control of the Russian Empire and later eventually the Soviet Union where larger waves of migration, with most notably being China, occurred in result of Central Asian revolt of 1916 and the Kazakh famine of 1930–1933. Since 1960s, the Kazakh migration has been viewed to be more voluntary with Turkey, Western Europe, and the United States being primary spots of emigration and following the dissolution of the Soviet Union in 1991, a new massive departure occurred from Kazakhstan, although most of the emigrees being overwhelmingly Russians, Germans, and Ukrainians when taking to account of Kazakhstan's large multiethnic population in which the latter groups have been interchangeably classified as Kazakh emigrants.

Classification and causes 
In general, there are three possible causes for the emergence of the Kazakh diaspora in which are highlighted:

 Political: 
 In the Russian Empire and the Soviet Union: the Central Asian revolt of 1916, Russian Civil War, the Kazakh famines of 1919–1922 and 1930–1933, and Operation Barbarossa during World War II.
 In the Republic of China: the Kazakh exodus from Xinjiang.
 Economical: the destruction of the Nomadic pastoralism after the Russian conquest of Central Asia and during the Soviet policies of Collectivization, labour immigration to Western Europe and the United States in the second half of the 20th century.
 Religious: the difficulty or complete impossibility of making a Hajj.

The Kazakh diaspora was formed on the basis of infection in several countries: first from Kazakhstan to China, then, including to the countries of Central Asia, Iran and Afghanistan, and eventually the rest of the world following the second half of the 20th century. The conservative minded older generation of the Kazakh diaspora is considered to be less welcome towards interethnic marriages, with the exception for marriages only being with other Turkic peoples.

History 
The instances of Kazakh migration first dates back to 1723, when during the Kazakh–Dzungar Wars, various Kazakh villages were pillaged and attacked by the Dzungars, resulting in many civilian deaths. As a result, the remaining surviving Kazakh tribes were forced to flee their homes and settle in the Khanate of Bukhara, Khanate of Khiva and Badakhshan, an event that become known as the Aqtaban Shubirindi (Great Retreat). In the 18–19th centuries, as the Kazakh Khanate was in the process of being absorbed by the Russian Empire, several failed uprisings took places by the Kazakhs against the Tsarist government's policies in auctioning fertile land to the ethnic Russians which led to another migration to China, Bukhara, Khiva, Afghanistan, and Persia.

It wasn't until in the beginning of the 20th century when the Kazakh diaspora began developing with the Central Asian revolt of 1916 over the Tsarist government's policies in conscripting Kazakhs along with other Central Asian peoples for labour battalions in World War I. The armed revolt eventually led to the massacre of several hundred thousand Kazakhs and caused a mass exodus through Tian Shan of 300,000 Kazakhs and Kyrgyz to neighbouring China. After the Bolsheviks established control of Kazakhstan following the Russian Civil War, many Kazakhs had also emigrated towards South and East with the countries being Afghanistan, Iran, China, as well as abroad in Turkey and France.

Under Joseph Stalin's enactment of the First five-year plan in 1928, a policy which formed collectivization in Kazakhstan, resulted in nomadic Kazakhs to be forcefully settled in collective farms that led to the decline of livestock populations due to a lack of adequate grazing, mandatory confiscations, and slaughtering to fulfill required grain quotas. As a result of the consequences, it eventually led to the Kazakh famine of 1930–1933, a catastrophic event which caused massive deaths of approximately 1.5 million people from starvation with the majority victims being ethnic Kazakhs. An estimated 665,000 to 1.1 million Kazakhs, risking punishment, fled to China, Mongolia, Afghanistan, Iran, and the Soviet republics of Uzbekistan, Kyrgyzstan, Turkmenistan, Tajikistan, and Russia in search for food and work.

Following German invasion of the Soviet Union during World War II in 1941, various Kazakhs serving in the ranks of Red Army subsequently became captured POWs where they were transferred to internment camps within German occupied territories served within Turkestan Legion or joined the French Resistance. After the defeat of Nazi Germany in 1941, majority of Kazakhs captured by the Allies were sent back to the Soviet Union while others who refused to return eventually settled in the Western Bloc nations such as Turkey and the United States.

In Xinjiang Province under the Republic of China where an estimated half million Kazakhs lived since beginning with the defeat and collapse of the Dzungar Khanate in the 18th century, experienced an exodus of Kazakhs beginning in the 1930s due to provincial governor Sheng Shicai's anti-Turkist purges which sought to populate the region with ethnic Han Chinese people. A second wave of Kazakh migration from Xinjiang occurred following the incorporation of the Second East Turkestan Republic to the People's Republic of China in 1949 with desired place for settlement being Pakistan and India.

References

Kazakhstani